Zinga is a genus of leafhoppers in the family Cicadellidae. There are at least two described species in Zinga.

Species
These two species belong to the genus Zinga:
 Zinga mayensis Dworakowska, 2011 c g
 Zinga novembris Dworakowska, 1972 c g
Data sources: i = ITIS, c = Catalogue of Life, g = GBIF, b = Bugguide.net

References

Further reading

 
 

Cicadellidae genera
Erythroneurini